Teodoro Willink Castro is the Vice Minister of Telecommunications of Costa Rica (in the Ministry of Science, Innovation, Technology and Telecommunications). Before his appointment as Vice Minister, he was Interim Professor at the University of Costa Rica, his research on cubesats was published by IEEE.

Education 
Willink Castro has a master's degree in Telecommunications Engineering from the Technical University of Twente and a Licentiate and bachelor's degrees in Electrical, Electronic and Communications Engineering from the University of Costa Rica.

References 

Costa Rican politicians
Living people
Year of birth missing (living people)